Charles Clack (February 18, 1857 – January 4, 1932) was an American farmer and politician.

Born in Coventry or Oxfordshire, England, Clack emigrated with his parents to the United States in 1867 and settled in the town of Burnett, Dodge County, Wisconsin. In 1878, Clack moved to the town of Freedom, Outagamie County, Wisconsin, where he was a farmer. Clack served as chairman of the Freedom Town Board. He also served as a trustee for the Outagamie Insane Asylum. He served on the school board and was treasurer and clerk of the school board. In 1897, Clack served in the Wisconsin State Assembly and was a Republican. Later, Clack moved to Appleton, Wisconsin and was involved with business. Clack died at his home in Orlando, Florida and was buried in Appleton, Wisconsin.

References

1857 births
1932 deaths
English emigrants to the United States
People from Oxfordshire
People from Freedom, Outagamie County, Wisconsin
Businesspeople from Wisconsin
Farmers from Wisconsin
Mayors of places in Wisconsin
School board members in Wisconsin
Republican Party members of the Wisconsin State Assembly
People from Burnett, Wisconsin